Macrocoma daccordii is a species of leaf beetle of Morocco, described by  in 1996.

References

daccordii
Beetles of North Africa
Beetles described in 1996
Endemic fauna of Morocco